Ann or Anne Graham may refer to:

Ann Graham (camogie), played in All-Ireland Senior Club Camogie Championship 1966
Ann Graham (musician) in Alabama Jazz Hall of Fame
Ann Carver Graham, character in Ann Carver's Profession
Ann Graham (artist), involved in Construction in Process
Anne Graham Lotz, née Anne Graham, Christian evangelist

See also
Anne Grahame Johnstone, children's book illustrator